The Northern Ireland Affairs Select Committee (or simply the Northern Ireland Affairs Committee) is a select committee of the House of Commons in the Parliament of the United Kingdom. The committee's remit is to examine the expenditure, administration and policy of the Northern Ireland Office and its associated public bodies. Select Committees work in both houses and report on governmental departments and economic affairs.

Membership
As of November 2022, the committee's membership is as follows:

Changes since 2019

2017-2019 Parliament
The election of the chair took place on 12 July 2017, with the members of the committee being announced on 11 September 2017.

Changes 2017-2019

2015-2017 Parliament
The chair was elected on 18 June 2015, with members being announced on 6 July 2015.

Changes 2015-2017

2010-2015 Parliament
The chair was elected on 10 June 2010, with members being announced on 26 July 2010.

Changes 2010-2015

List of chairs

See also
List of Committees of the United Kingdom Parliament
Northern Ireland Grand Committee

References

External links
 Northern Ireland Affairs Committee Homepage
Records for this Committee are held at the Parliamentary Archives

Select Committees of the British House of Commons